11Q13, also 11QMelch or the Melchizedek document, is a fragmentary manuscript among the Dead Sea Scrolls (from Cave 11) which mentions Melchizedek as leader of God's angels in a war in Heaven against the angels of darkness instead of the more familiar Archangel Michael. The text is an apocalyptic commentary on the Jubilee year of Leviticus 25. The Dead Sea Scrolls contain texts in Hebrew, Aramaic and Greek, the language of 11Q13 is Hebrew, date of composition is circa 100 BCE.

"Elohim"
In the fragmentary passage the term "Elohim" appears a dozen times, mainly referring to the God of Israel, but in commentary on "who says to Zion "Your Elohim reigns" (Isa. 52;7) 11Q13 states that Zion is the congregation of all the sons of righteousness, while Melchizedek is "Your Elohim" who
will deliver the sons of righteousness from Belial.

Content

References

External links
Translation in The Dead Sea Scrolls Today by James C. VanderKam (2010), pp. 73–74

Dead Sea Scrolls
Messianism
Melchizedek
Israel Antiquities Authority
War in Heaven